October 3 - Eastern Orthodox liturgical calendar - October 5

All fixed commemorations below celebrated on October 17 by Eastern Orthodox Churches on the Old Calendar.

For October 4th, Orthodox Churches on the Old Calendar commemorate the Saints listed on September 21.

Saints
 Hieromartyr Hierotheus of Athens, first Bishop of Athens (1st century)
 Venerable Theodore the Wonderworker, Bishop of Tamassos, Cyprus (2nd century)
 Martyrs Gaius, Faustus, Eusebius, and Chaeremon, Deacons, of Alexandria (3rd century)  (see also: October 3)
 Martyrs Domnina and her daughters Berenice (Bernice) and Prosdoce, of Syria (302)
 Martyr Adauctus (c. 312) and his daughter St. Callisthene (c. 318), of Ephesus.
 Venerable Paul the Simple (c. 339) and Venerable Ammon (350), of Egypt, disciples of St. Anthony the Great.
 Hieromartyr Peter of Capitolia, Bishop of Bostra in Arabia (715)
 Venerable John (Lampadistes) of Cyprus (10th century)
 Saint Vladimir Yaroslavich, prince of Novgorod (1052), and his mother St. Anna of Novgorod (Ingegerd Olofsdotter of Sweden) (1050)

Pre-Schism Western saints
 Saint Petronius of Bologna, Bishop of Bologna (c. 450)
 Saint Quintius of Tours (Quentin), a citizen of Tours, martyred at L'Indrois near Montrésor (6th century)
 Saint Aurea, a Syrian who moved to France and became Abbess of St Martial in Paris, where she remained for thirty-three years (666)

Post-Schism Orthodox saints
 Saints Helladius and Onesimus of the Near Caves in Kiev (12th-13th centuries)
 Saint Ammon, recluse, of the Far Caves in Kiev (13th century)
 Saint Stephen Stiljanovic, despot of Srem, Serbia (1540), and his wife St. Elena (Elizabeth in monasticism) (c. 1543)
 Saints Jonah and Nectarius, monks, of Kazan (16th century)
 Hieromartyr Evdemoz I, Catholicos of Georgia (1642)
 Saint Peter (Michurin) of Kuznetsk, Siberia (1820)

New Martys and Confessors
 New Hieromartyr Demetrius Voznesensky, Priest (1918)
 New Hieromartyrs Nicholas Vereschagin, Michael Tverdovsky, Jacob Bobirev and Tikhon Archangelsky, Priests (1937) 
 New Hieromartyr Basil (Tsvetkov), Archimandrite, of Stary Kelets, Ryazan (1937)
 Saint Khionia Archangelsky, Confessor (1945)
 New Hiero-confessor Barsanuphius (Yurchenko) of Kherson (1954)

Other commemorations
 Uncovering of the relics (1595) of St. Gurias (1563), first Archbishop of Kazan, and St. Barsanuphius, Bishop of Tver (1576)
 Synaxis of the Saints of Kazan.
 Synaxis of the Saints of Novgorod.  (see also: February 10 )
 Synaxis of the Icon of the Theotokos "Kitrinopetritissa" ("Yellow-stone") in Australia.

Icon gallery

Notes

References

Sources 
 October 4/17. Orthodox Calendar (PRAVOSLAVIE.RU).
 October 17 / October 4. HOLY TRINITY RUSSIAN ORTHODOX CHURCH (A parish of the Patriarchate of Moscow).
 October 4. OCA - The Lives of the Saints.
 The Autonomous Orthodox Metropolia of Western Europe and the Americas (ROCOR). St. Hilarion Calendar of Saints for the year of our Lord 2004. St. Hilarion Press (Austin, TX). p. 74.
 The Fourth Day of the Month of October. Orthodoxy in China.
 October 4. Latin Saints of the Orthodox Patriarchate of Rome.
 The Roman Martyrology. Transl. by the Archbishop of Baltimore. Last Edition, According to the Copy Printed at Rome in 1914. Revised Edition, with the Imprimatur of His Eminence Cardinal Gibbons. Baltimore: John Murphy Company, 1916. pp. 305–306.
 Rev. Richard Stanton. A Menology of England and Wales, or, Brief Memorials of the Ancient British and English Saints Arranged According to the Calendar, Together with the Martyrs of the 16th and 17th Centuries. London: Burns & Oates, 1892. pp. 474–475.
Greek Sources
 Great Synaxaristes:  4 ΟΚΤΩΒΡΙΟΥ. ΜΕΓΑΣ ΣΥΝΑΞΑΡΙΣΤΗΣ.
  Συναξαριστής. 4 Οκτωβρίου. ECCLESIA.GR. (H ΕΚΚΛΗΣΙΑ ΤΗΣ ΕΛΛΑΔΟΣ).
  04/10/2016. Ορθόδοξος Συναξαριστής. 
Russian Sources
  17 октября (4 октября). Православная Энциклопедия под редакцией Патриарха Московского и всея Руси Кирилла (электронная версия). (Orthodox Encyclopedia - Pravenc.ru).
  4 октября по старому стилю / 17 октября по новому стилю. Русская Православная Церковь - Православный церковный календарь на 2016 год.

October in the Eastern Orthodox calendar